Fuego en la sangre is a 1966 Argentine film directed by René Cardona Jr. and starring Libertad Leblanc, Julio Aldama, Guillermo Battaglia, and Raúl del Valle. It premiered on March 11, 1965.

Plot summary 
The movie relates the story of a woman with too many love demands in a rural setting.

Cast
Libertad Leblanc
Julio Aldama
Guillermo Battaglia
Raúl del Valle
Carmen Jimenez
Eduardo Bener
José Orange

References

External links
 

1966 films
Argentine drama films
1960s Spanish-language films
1960s Argentine films